Minnesota NORML is the National Organization for the Reform of Marijuana Laws (NORML) affiliate for the U.S. state of Minnesota. As of 2017, Michael Ford served as the organization's executive director.

History
Tim Davis served as Minnesota NORML's director in the 1980s and 1990s.

In 2014, Randy Quast was executive director of the Minnesota chapter of NORML. In 2016, Quast was appointed interim director of national NORML, replacing outgoing director Allen St. Pierre.

In 2015, Marcus Harcus served as Minnesota NORML's executive director.

See also

 Cannabis in Minnesota
 Grassroots-Legalize Cannabis Party
 List of cannabis organizations

References

External links
 
 

Cannabis in Minnesota
Cannabis organizations
National Organization for the Reform of Marijuana Laws
Organizations based in Minnesota